Central (also Central District) is the central business district of Hong Kong. It is located in the northeastern corner of the Central and Western District, on the north shore of Hong Kong Island, across Victoria Harbour from Tsim Sha Tsui, the southernmost point of Kowloon Peninsula. The area was the heart of Victoria City, although that name is rarely used today.

As the central business district of Hong Kong, it is the area where many multinational financial services corporations have their headquarters. Consulates general and consulates of many countries are also located in this area, as is Government Hill, the site of the government headquarters until 2011. The area, with its proximity to Victoria Harbour, has served as the centre of trade and financial activities from the earliest days of the British colonial era in 1841, and continues to flourish and serve as the place of administration after the handover to China in 1997.

Naming

The area of Chung Wan (aka Choong Wan in the past), named Central in English, was one of the districts in Victoria City. The English name Central became prevalent  and the connected stations of Pedder and Chater renamed as Central. On some older maps, it and the area to its west are named Kwan Tai Lo below Victoria Peak. It formed a channel, Chung Mun, with Tsim Sha Tsui, on the sea route along the coast of southern China. The eastern part of Central District has been known as Admiralty since the completion of Admiralty station in the early 1980s.

Location
Central is located on the north shore of Hong Kong Island, across Victoria Harbour from Tsim Sha Tsui, the southernmost point of Kowloon Peninsula. It is bordered in the west by Sheung Wan, with the border being along Aberdeen Street (also called Wing Kut Street). It is bordered in the east by Admiralty, an eastern extension of the central business district. As such, Admiralty is sometimes considered a part of Central. Central is bordered in the south by Mid-Levels, an area halfway up Victoria Peak. The boundary between Central and Mid-Levels is not clearly defined.

For district council elections purposes, the area, together with Admiralty, correspond roughly to the "Chung Wan" constituency. The boundaries of such constituencies may be subject to modification.

History

The British landed on Possession Point of Sheung Wan in 1841. They soon decided to build a city on the north coast of Hong Kong Island, and the present-day Central was chosen to house major military facilities and an administrative centre. The area soon attracted both Westerners and Chinese to trade and live in the area, and a Canton Bazaar (precursor of Central Market) was built between Cochrane Street and Graham Street in 1842. The area was soon zoned for Westerners only, and the Chinese residents were restricted to Sheung Wan. [It was zoned for "Western-style buildings," meaning buildings with minimum space and hygiene standards]. The area was largely dominated by the presence of Victoria City. The popularity of this area would also boost the population of Hong Kong from 5,000 in 1841 to 24,000 in 1848. Government House and other Hong Kong Government buildings were completed during this period on Government Hill. Various barracks, naval base and residence of Commander, Flagstaff House were built on the east end of the district. Between 1860 and 1880 the construction of City Hall, Theatre Royal and other financial structures made Central the heart of Hong Kong.

In 1904, the Praya Reclamation Scheme added  of land to Central's waterfront. Many of the proposals came from Sir Paul Chater and James Johnstone Keswick, the founders of Hongkong Land. During the 1920s, Hong Kong was able to push far ahead economically, because of the cohesive collaboration between Central and all waterfront commerce.

The military structures survived until the 1980s. Only Flagstaff House remains as Museum of Tea Ware in Hong Kong Park. City Hall sat on the present premises of the HSBC Hong Kong headquarters. Hong Kong's first road, Queen's Road, passes through the area and the business centre continued to expand toward the shoreline as far as the reclaimed lands.

Central has been the site of a number of major political protests. From October 2011 to September 2012, the Occupy Central movement against global economic inequality was based in front of the HSBC Main Building. Two years later, in September 2014, democratic activists initiated Occupy Central with Love and Peace, demanding universal suffrage for the election of the Chief Executive of Hong Kong, eventually contributing to the Umbrella Revolution.

Economy

There are many Grade-A commercial buildings in Central, a prime commercial district in Hong Kong.

Bank of China (Hong Kong) has its head office in the Bank of China Tower. The Hongkong and Shanghai Banking Corporation, a subsidiary of HSBC, has its head office in the HSBC Main Building. Bank of East Asia and Hang Seng Bank have their head offices in Central. Chu Kong Passenger Transport is headquartered in the Chu Kong Shipping Tower (珠江船務大廈) in Central.

Before 1999, Cathay Pacific had its head office in the Swire House in Central. In 1999, the airline relocated its head office to the Hong Kong International Airport.

Nord Anglia Education, which operates international schools in various countries, formerly had its head office in Central. The head office moved to Hong Kong in 2012. In 2018 the company announced it was returning its head office to the United Kingdom.

Notable places, streets and buildings

Office buildings

 8 Queen's Road Central
9 Queen's Road Central
Agricultural Bank of China Tower
AIA Central
Alexandra House
Bank of America Tower
Bank of China Building, housing the China Club
Bank of China Tower
Central Building
Chater House
Cheung Kong Center
Cheung Kong Center II
Citibank Plaza
CITIC Tower
Entertainment Building
Exchange Square, housing the Hong Kong Stock Exchange
Henley Building
Hong Kong Club Building, housing the Hong Kong Club
Hong Kong Trade Centre
HSBC Main Building
Hutchison House
Jardine House
Man Yee Building
Prince's Building
St. John's Building
Standard Chartered Bank Building
The Center
The Centrium
The Henderson
The Landmark (office and shopping complex)
International Finance Centre (IFC), the second tallest building in Hong Kong
Wheelock House
Wing On House
World-Wide House
York House

Streets and squares

Aberdeen Street, marking the limit between Central and Sheung Wan
Arbuthnot Road
Battery Path
Chater Road
Connaught Place
Cochrane Street
Connaught Road Central
Cotton Tree Drive
D'Aguilar Street
Des Voeux Road Central
Edinburgh Place, a public square adjacent to the Victoria Harbour
Elgin Street
Gage Street, a market street
Garden Road
Glenealy
Graham Street, a market street
Gutzlaff Street
Hollywood Road
Ice House Street
Jubilee Street. Named for the Golden Jubilee of Queen Victoria in 1887.
Lower Albert Road
Lyndhurst Terrace
Old Bailey Street
On Lan Street
Pedder Street
Peel Street
Pottinger Street, one of the "ladder streets"
Queen's Road Central, the first road in Hong Kong built by the Government of Hong Kong between 1841 and 1843
Queen Victoria Street
Queensway, in Admiralty
Stanley Street
Statue Square, a public pedestrian square
Staunton Street
Staveley Street, one of the "ladder streets"
Theatre Lane, home to many of Hong Kong's shoe shiners
Wellington Street
Wyndham Street
Wing On Street, aka. Cloth Street

Government buildings

Central Government Complex, Tamar
Former Central Government Offices on Government Hill
Chinese People's Liberation Army Forces Hong Kong Building
City Hall
Former French Mission Building, housing the Court of Final Appeal
General Post Office, Hong Kong
Government House
Hong Kong Planning and Infrastructure Exhibition Gallery
Legislative Council Building
Queensway Government Offices

Other historical buildings
Bishop's House
Central Market
Central Police Station
Duddell Street Steps and Gas Lamps
Flagstaff House
Former Central Magistracy
Hong Kong Visual Arts Centre
Old Dairy Farm Depot, housing the Hong Kong Fringe Club and the Foreign Correspondents' Club
Pedder Building
The Cenotaph
The Helena May main building
Victoria Prison
Zetland Hall
Central and Western Heritage Trail
Dr Sun Yat-sen Historical Trail

Hotels
Central, together with Tsim Sha Tsui and Tsim Sha Tsui East, is home to many hotels.
Conrad Hong Kong (Pacific Place, Admiralty)
Four Seasons Hotel Hong Kong (IFC)
Hong Kong Hilton (demolished in 1995)
JW Marriott Hotel Hong Kong (Pacific Place, Admiralty)
Landmark Mandarin Oriental (The Landmark)
Mandarin Oriental (Connaught Road Central)
The Murray, Hong Kong
Ovolo Hotels (2 Arbuthnot Road). Opened in October 2012.
Ritz-Carlton (Chater Road), closed 1 January 2008.
Island Shangri-La (Pacific Place, Admiralty)

Entertainment areas
Lan Kwai Fong, the location of numerous bars, restaurants and clubs
Hong Kong Maritime Museum, Central Ferry Pier 8
SoHo, Hong Kong
Wyndham Street

Places of worship
Various Buddhist temples
St. John's Cathedral (Sheng Kung Hui, Anglican Church)
First Church of Christ Scientist
Union Church
Immaculate Conception Cathedral, Hong Kong (Roman Catholic)
St. Joseph's Church (Roman Catholic)

Parks

Chater Garden
Cheung Kong Park
Hong Kong Park, former location of the Victoria Barracks
Hong Kong Zoological and Botanical Gardens
Statue Square

Schools
  (高主教書院)
Sacred Heart Canossian School
St Joseph's College, Hong Kong
Ying Wa Girls' School (in Mid-Levels)
St. Paul's Co-educational College (in Mid-Levels)

Central is in Primary One Admission (POA) School Net 11.

Former buildings

Beaconsfield House, demolished in 1995
Hong Kong Hilton, closed in 1995
Hongkong Hotel, closed in 1952
Murray House, part of Murray Barracks, moved to Stanley
Old Central Government Offices, demolished in 1954
Wellington Barracks, demolished in 1992
City Hall Ferry Pier, barge pier, closed due to the Central and Wan Chai Reclamation
Edinburgh Place Ferry Pier, demolished in 2007
Blake Pier, Central, demolished, partially moved to Stanley
Queen's Pier, demolished in 2008
United Pier, demolished in 1994

Transport

Public transport
The area is a major transport hub for Hong Kong (see also Transport in Hong Kong).

Bus
KMB, serving only cross-harbour routes on Hong Kong Island
First Bus
Citybus
Minibus
Trains and Trams
MTR – Island line, Tsuen Wan line, Tung Chung line, Airport Express, South Island line, East Rail line at Sheung Wan, Hong Kong, Central and Admiralty stations
Tram
Peak Tram
Ferries
Sun Ferry, to Silvermine Bay (Mui Wo), Peng Chau and Cheung Chau
Hong Kong & Kowloon Ferry, to Sok Kwu Wan and Yung Shue Wan on Lamma Island
Star Ferry, to Tsim Sha Tsui and Hung Hom
Discovery Bay Ferry, to Tsim Sha Tsui East and Discovery Bay
Park Island Ferry
Ferry piers:
Central Piers
Star Ferry Pier, Central
Pedestrian facilities
Central Elevated Walkway
Central–Mid-Levels escalator

Expressways and routes
Route 4
Connaught Road Central
Central–Wan Chai Bypass

Climate

References

External links

Photo Tour of Central Hong Kong, About.com
 Map of Central District in 1964 (crown copyright)
 Map of Hongkong Central 1911

 
Central and Western District, Hong Kong
Central business districts
Economy of Hong Kong
Hong Kong
Populated coastal places in Hong Kong
Populated places in Hong Kong
Areas of Hong Kong
Victoria City